The 2018 Paris–Nice was a road cycling stage race that took place between 4 and 11 March 2018 in France. It was the 76th edition of the Paris–Nice and the sixth event of the 2018 UCI World Tour.

The race was won on the final day by the 's Marc Soler from Spain. Having started the final stage 37 seconds down on race leader Simon Yates in sixth place overall, Soler attacked around halfway into the stage along with compatriot David de la Cruz; the duo joined Omar Fraile at the head of the race, and the trio managed to stay clear of the rest of the field by the time they reached Nice. As de la Cruz and Fraile contested stage honours, Soler finished third – acquiring four bonus seconds on the finish in addition to three gained at an earlier intermediate sprint – and with a 35-second gap to Yates and the remaining general classification contenders, it was enough to give Soler victory over Yates by four seconds. The podium was completed by 's Gorka Izagirre, moving ahead of teammate and brother Ion Izagirre due to bonus seconds won on the final day, 14 seconds behind Soler, who also won the white jersey as best young rider.

 won the two other jerseys on offer in the race; Tim Wellens won the green jersey for the points classification, taking five top-ten finishes over the course of the week, while Thomas De Gendt was the winner of the mountains classification. With the performances of the Izagirre brothers,  were the winners of the teams classification.

Teams
As Paris–Nice is a UCI World Tour event, all eighteen UCI WorldTeams were invited automatically and obliged to enter a team in the race. Four UCI Professional Continental teams competed, completing the 22-team peloton. Paris–Nice is the first race for  under this nomenclature, as French insurance company Groupama signed a co-naming sponsorship deal with the team.

Route
The route of the 2018 Paris–Nice was announced on 9 January 2018.

Stages

Stage 1
4 March 2018 — Chatou to Meudon,

Stage 2
5 March 2018 — Orsonville to Vierzon,

Stage 3
6 March 2018 — Bourges to Châtel-Guyon,

Stage 4
7 March 2018 — La Fouillouse to Saint-Étienne, individual time trial (ITT)

Stage 5
8 March 2018 — Salon-de-Provence to Sisteron,

Stage 6
9 March 2018 — Sisteron to Vence,

Stage 7
10 March 2018 — Nice to Valdeblore La Colmiane,

Stage 8
11 March 2018 — Nice to Nice,

Classification leadership table
In the 2018 Paris–Nice, four jerseys were awarded. The general classification was calculated by adding each cyclist's finishing times on each stage. Time bonuses were awarded to the first three finishers on all stages except for the individual time trial: the stage winner won a ten-second bonus, with six and four seconds for the second and third riders respectively. Bonus seconds were also awarded to the first three riders at intermediate sprints – three seconds for the winner of the sprint, two seconds for the rider in second and one second for the rider in third. The leader of the general classification received a yellow jersey. This classification was considered the most important of the 2018 Paris–Nice, and the winner of the classification was considered the winner of the race.

The second classification was the points classification. Riders were awarded points for finishing in the top ten in a stage. Unlike in the points classification in the Tour de France, the winners of all stages were awarded the same number of points. Points were also won in intermediate sprints; three points for crossing the sprint line first, two points for second place, and one for third. The leader of the points classification was awarded a green jersey.

There was also a mountains classification, for which points were awarded for reaching the top of a climb before other riders. Each climb was categorised as either first, second, or third-category, with more points available for the more difficult, higher-categorised climbs. For first-category climbs, the top seven riders earned points; on second-category climbs, five riders won points; on third-category climbs, only the top three riders earned points. The leadership of the mountains classification was marked by a white jersey with red polka-dots.

The fourth jersey represented the young rider classification, marked by a white jersey. Only riders born after 1 January 1993 were eligible; the young rider best placed in the general classification was the leader of the young rider classification. There was also a classification for teams, in which the times of the best three cyclists in a team on each stage were added together; the leading team at the end of the race was the team with the lowest cumulative time.

References

External links

2018 UCI World Tour
2018 in French sport
2018
March 2018 sports events in France